Cyclopeplus peruvianus is a species of beetle in the family Cerambycidae. It was described by Tippmann in 1939.

References

Anisocerini
Beetles described in 1939